The Cleveland Heights–University Heights City School District is a public school district based in University Heights, Ohio, United States.

The district enrolled 5,062 students as of January 10, 2020, and covers most of Cleveland Heights, all of University Heights, and a small portion of South Euclid.

Schools
There are a total of ten schools in the Cleveland Heights–University Heights City School District – seven elementary, two middle, one high school, an early childhood learning center, and a school for students with emotional needs.

Nine schools are located within the city limits of Cleveland Heights, while Gearity Professional Development School is located in University Heights. The Coventry Elementary School and Wiley Middle School buildings are no longer used as active school buildings. Roosevelt Junior High School has been demolished.

High school
Grades 9–12
Cleveland Heights High School (Cleveland Heights)

Middle schools
Grades 6–8
Monticello Middle School (Cleveland Heights); closed for renovations in 2017 and reopened for the 2019–2020 school year.
Roxboro Middle School (Cleveland Heights); closed for renovations in 2017 and reopened for the 2019–2020 school year.

Elementary schools
Grades K–5
Boulevard Elementary School (Cleveland Heights)
Canterbury Elementary School (Cleveland Heights)
Fairfax Elementary School (Cleveland Heights)
Gearity Professional Development School (University Heights)
Noble Elementary School (Cleveland Heights)
Oxford Elementary School (Cleveland Heights)
Roxboro Elementary School (Cleveland Heights)

Other campuses
Grades 6–12
Bellefaire School (University Heights)
Preschool
Early Childhood Center (University Heights)

See also
List of school districts in Ohio

References

External links

School districts in Cuyahoga County, Ohio
Cleveland Heights, Ohio